Sebastián Prieto and Horacio Zeballos were the defending champions, but decided not to participate.
Andre Begemann and Martin Emmrich won in the German final, against Gero Kretschmer and Alex Satschko 6–4, 7–6(5).

Seeds

Draw

Draw

External links
 Main Draw

Seguros Bolivar Open Cali - Doubles
2010 Doubles